Christopher W. S. Ross (born October 4, 1943) is an Ecuadorian-born American former diplomat who served as United States Ambassador to Algeria and Syria. On January 7, 2009, he was appointed as the UN envoy to Western Sahara. He resigned in March 2017.

He was until recently a special adviser for the Middle East and North Africa at the U.S. mission to the United Nations. His father was Ambassador Claude Gordon "Tony" Ross. In 2003 he was the US State Department Senior Adviser for Arab World Public Diplomacy.

Notes and references

External links 
Online NewsHour: Christopher Ross -- January 16, 2002 Ross discusses scope of public diplomacy campaign
State Department Archived Biographies -- Christopher W.S. Ross - Coordinator For Counterterrorism

1943 births
Living people
Ambassadors of the United States to Algeria
Ambassadors of the United States to Syria
People from Quito
United States Foreign Service personnel
20th-century American diplomats